The West Indies cricket team toured South Africa during the 2003–04 season and played a four-match Test series and a five-match One Day International series against the South Africa national cricket team, as well as five tour matches. This tour immediately followed a tour of Zimbabwe.

West Indies was led in the Test and ODI series by Brian Lara while South Africa was led by Graeme Smith.

South Africa won the Test series 3–0 and the ODI series 3–1. Jacques Kallis of South Africa emerged as the top run-scorer in the Test series with 712 runs, with an average of 178.00, followed by Herschelle Gibbs with 583 runs at an average of 116.60. Makhaya Ntini finished the series as top wicket-taker with 29 wickets, followed by André Nel with 22 and Shaun Pollock with 16. Ntini was named "man of the Test series".

Squads 

Jerome Taylor, Marlon Samuels, and Omari Banks returned home injured prior to the start of the Test series and were replaced by Dave Mohammed, Dwayne Smith, and Adam Sanford respectively.

Test matches

1st Test

2nd Test

3rd Test

4th Test

ODI series summary

1st ODI

2nd ODI

3rd ODI

4th ODI

5th ODI

References

External links
 Tour home at ESPNcricinfo
 West Indies in South Africa, Dec 2003 - Feb 2004 at ESPNcricinfo archive
 
 

2003 in South African cricket
2004 in South African cricket
2003–04 South African cricket season
2003-04
International cricket competitions in 2003–04
2003 in West Indian cricket
2004 in West Indian cricket